Alfred Feebery (10 September 1909 – 23 December 1989) was an English professional footballer who played as a left back. He made 221 appearances in the Football League for Notts County. He also played on loan at Midland League club Newark and appeared three times for Bristol Rovers in the abandoned 1939–40 Football League season.

Feebery was born in Hucknall, Nottinghamshire, in 1909. He came from a footballing family: two brothers, Jack and Albert, also played in the Football League, and three others played at lesser levels. He was living in Hucknall at the time of his death, in 1989 at the age of 80.

References

1909 births
1989 deaths
People from Hucknall
Footballers from Nottinghamshire
English footballers
Association football fullbacks
Notts County F.C. players
Newark Town F.C. players
Bristol Rovers F.C. players
Southern Football League players
English Football League players